Eric Khoo Heng-Pheng (17 April 195613 January 2014) was one of 12 elected volunteer members of the World Scout Committee, the main executive body of the World Organization of the Scout Movement, and Chairman of its Asia Pacific Regional Scout Committee, elected in 2001. He was elected at the 38th World Scout Conference in South Korea for a six-year term.

Early life 

Khoo was from Tengkera, Malacca, Malaysia. He was a company director in Petaling Jaya, Selangor, and consultant for public relations and marketing. His business activities involved logistics, engineering, warehouse and property development. He was a member of the Royal Commonwealth Society and the Chartered Institute of Marketing.

Scouting 

Khoo joined Scouting in 1965 at the age of nine as a Cub Scout and earned his King's Scout award in 1973. He has served as a Rover Scout leader, Scout Leader at the Maz International School, Chairman of the 25th Asia Pacific Region Scout Jamboree in Thailand in 2006, and Assistant National Chief Commissioner of the Scouts Association of Malaysia, as well as various positions in the King Scout's Association of Malaysia.

Khoo attended the 1999 35th World Scout Conference in Durban, South Africa, as well as the 2002 36th World Scout Conference in Greece and the 37th World Scout Conference in Tunisia.

Awards 

Khoo was awarded:

 The Distinguished Service Award from the Scouts Association of Malaysia.
 The Distinguished Service Cross from the Scout Association of Hong Kong.
 The President Scout Award from the Boy Scouts of the Philippines.
 The Golden Rhinoceros Award from the Nepal Scouts.
 The Silver Eagle Award from the Scout Association of Japan.
 The Distinguished Service Award from the Singapore Scout Association.
 The White Tiger Award from the Bangladesh Scouts.
 The Distinguished Service Award from Gerakan Pramuka.

Death 

He died on 13 January 2014 from a heart attack.

See also
 King's Scout (Scouts Association of Malaysia)
 Association of Top Achiever Scouts (ATAS)

References

External links
https://web.archive.org/web/20070804062749/http://www.apr.scout.or.jp/publications/2005inbox/Jan%20Inbox2005.htm
https://web.archive.org/web/20090105195622/http://www.scoutinginlondon.org.uk/Pages/News/Articles/2008/worldscoutconference.html

1956 births
2014 deaths
People from Malacca
Scouting and Guiding in Malaysia
World Scout Committee members